The team competition for Tennis at the 2022 Pacific Mini Games took place at the American Memorial Park and Pacific Islands Club in Saipan, Northern Mariana Islands from 16 to 18 June 2022.

Schedule

Men's team event

Group stage 
Four groups were drawn for the men's event. With only fifteen teams entered, Group A consists of 3 teams while groups B, C, and D featured 4 teams. Each team played each other once with only the top ranked team of each group advancing through to the play-offs.

Group A

Group B

Group C

Group D

Finals play-offs 
The play-offs features only the winners of each group playing a semi-final round followed by the medal matches.

Semi-final 1

Semi-final 2

Bronze medal match

Gold medal match

Women's team event

Group stage
Three groups were drawn for the women's event. With only ten teams entered, Groups A and B consists of 3 teams each while group C featured 4 teams. Each team played each other once with only the top ranked team of each group plus the best ranked second placed team advancing through to the play-offs.

Group A

Group B

Group C

Finals play-offs
The play-offs features only the winners of each group playing a semi-final round folled by the medal matches.

Semi-final 1

Semi-final 2

Bronze medal match

Gold medal match

References

2022 Pacific Mini Games
Tennis at the Pacific Games
2022 in tennis